The 1931 Kilkenny Intermediate Hurling Championship was the third staging of the Kilkenny Intermediate Hurling Championship since its establishment by the Kilkenny County Board in 1929. The championship consisted of just one game between the two divisional championship winners.

The final was played on 13 March 1932 at Nowlan Park in Kilkenny, between Danesfort and Slieverue, in what was their first meeting in a final. Danesfort won the match by 4-06 to 4-01 to claim their first championship title.

Qualification

Results

Final

References

External links
 Kilkenny GAA website

Kilkenny Intermediate Hurling Championship
Kilkenny Intermediate Hurling Championship